The Shadowers is a novel by Donald Hamilton first published in 1964, continuing the exploits of assassin Matt Helm. It was the seventh novel of the series.

Plot summary
Matt Helm, code name "Eric" is assigned to stop Emil Taussig, whose goal is to assassinate world leaders and scientists as a prelude to a Russian attack. This book starts with the death of Gail from 'the Silencers'.

External links
Synopsis and summary 

1964 American novels
Matt Helm novels